Maryborough West is a mixed-use locality in the Fraser Coast Region, Queensland, Australia.

Geography 
The Mary River forms the south-western boundary of the locality.

There is residential housing near the river, but the locality is predominantly used for other purposes, including industrial estates, the Maryborough Showgrounds, and the heritage-listed Maryborough Cemetery.

The Bruce Highway passes through the locality from the south-west (Tinana) to the north (Aldershot).

History
Maryborough Christian Academy opened as a primary school on 1 February 1983 at the Maryborough Christian Outreach Centre and expanded over time, being renamed Riverside Christian College in 2002.

Education 
Riverside Christian College is a private primary and secondary (Prep-12) school at 23 Royle Street.

There are no government schools in Maryborough West. The nearest government primary school is Sunbury State School in neighbouring Maryborough to the south-east. The nearest government secondary school is Aldridge State High School in neighbouring Maryborough to the east.

Amenities 
LifeChurch Maryborough is at 68 Gayndah Road. It is part of the Wesleyan Methodist Church of Australia.

References 

Fraser Coast Region
Localities in Queensland